Manuel Salvo (June 30, 1912 – February 7, 1997) was a Major League Baseball pitcher.  The ,  right-hander played for the New York Giants (1939), Boston Bees / Braves (1940–43), and Philadelphia Phillies (1943). His nickname was "Gyp", short for "Gypsy".

A native of Sacramento, California, Salvo had his best season statistically in 1940 with the Bees. He won 10, lost 9, making it the only season of his career in which he finished with more wins than losses. He also shared the National League lead with 5 shutouts, and ranked eighth in the league with a 3.08 earned run average.

While Salvo had a poor win–loss record, his career Adjusted ERA+ was only slightly below average at 98. He only pitched for one winning team, the 1939 Giants, and at 77–74 they were barely over the .500 mark.

Salvo died at the age of 83 in Vallejo, California.

Notes

External links

Major League Baseball pitchers
Baseball players from Sacramento, California
New York Giants (NL) players
Boston Bees players
Boston Braves players
Philadelphia Phillies players
San Diego Padres (minor league) players
1912 births
1997 deaths